Luther Irvin “Rep” Replogle (March 2, 1902 Tyrone, Pennsylvania − July 3, 1981 Chicago, Illinois) was a businessman, diplomat, and philanthropist, and the founder of Replogle Globes and the U.S. Ambassador to Iceland from 1969 to 1972.

When he was five, his family moved to Altoona, Pennsylvania. He attended the U.S. Naval Academy at Annapolis for 2½ years, starting in 1920.

Replogle Globes was the largest globe manufacturing business in the world in the mid-20th century. He sold the company in 1959 but continued as President and Chief Operating Officer.

References

External links
Replogle Globes, Inc., est. 1930, Made in Chicago Museum

American company founders
American chief operating officers
American philanthropists
Ambassadors of the United States to Iceland
People from Altoona, Pennsylvania
People from Tyrone, Pennsylvania
United States Naval Academy alumni
Military personnel from Pennsylvania